Horki may refer to:

Horki, Horki Raion, a town in the Mogilev Region of Belarus
Horki Raion
Horki, Brest Region, a village in Belarus
Horki, Gomel Region, a village in Belarus

See also
Gorky (disambiguation)
Górki (disambiguation), locations in Poland
Gorki (disambiguation), locations in Russia